The grey ant-blue (Acrodipsas melania) is a butterfly native to Australia.

References

Acrodipsas
Butterflies of Australia
Butterflies described in 1980